Carboxypeptidase M is an enzyme that in humans is encoded by the CPM gene.

Function 

The protein encoded by this gene is a membrane-bound arginine/lysine carboxypeptidase. Its expression is associated with monocyte to macrophage differentiation. This encoded protein contains hydrophobic regions at the amino and carboxy termini and has 6 potential asparagine-linked glycosylation sites. The active site residues of carboxypeptidases A and B are conserved in this protein. Three alternatively spliced transcript variants encoding the same protein have been described for this gene.

References

External links

Further reading